Katsiaryna Hanchar (born 30 August 1988, in Gomel) is a Belarusian sprinter. She competed for the Belarusian team in the 4 × 100 metres relay at the 2012 Summer Olympics; the team placed 14th with a time of 43.90 in Round 1 and did not qualify for the final.

References

1988 births
Living people
Belarusian female sprinters
Olympic athletes of Belarus
Athletes (track and field) at the 2012 Summer Olympics
Sportspeople from Gomel
European Games competitors for Belarus
Wrestlers at the 2015 European Games
Olympic female sprinters